Bossall is a hamlet in the Ryedale district of North Yorkshire, England with fewer than 100 residents. The Church of St Botolph was built in the 12th century with later alterations and is a Grade I listed building. The term Bosall was drawn from the name of 7th-century bishop Bosa of York who was said to have built a church here.

The community is mentioned in the Domesday Book as Boscele and as Bosciale in the hundred of Bulford; at that time, the property was held by "Hugh, son of Baldric" or Hugh fitzBaldric and included a church. In 1086, there were 19 residents in approximately 6.9 households, in addition to a priest. This property produced an annual income of "3 pounds in 1086; 2 pounds 10 shillings in 1066".
 
Records from 1823 indicate that there were only three houses and a population of 31, increasing to 76 by 1842; archaeological evidence showed that the village was previously much larger. It is thought to have been devastated by the Black Death in 1349. Centuries ago, the community included a quadrangular castle built in the 1300s by Paulinus de Bossall which was replaced by the current manor built in the 17th century; stone from the original castle walls was used in that project. By 1923, there was no village per-se here, "the church having in close proximity only the rectory, a modern building, and Bossall Hall".

Bossall Hall
From the early 1300s until the 1420s the manor was held by Paulinus de Bossall and his descendants, after which time it was owned by the Redman or Redmayne family from whom it was later passed by marriage to the Thwaites. In the 1620s it was sold to William Belt. It was around this time that the Grade II listed Bossall Hall was built. Although Sir Robert Belt was dispossessed following the English Civil War, the family continued to hold the manor until the late 1880s.

In 1890, the manor was sold to Sir James Walker, 2nd Baronet (Sand Hutton). A report from 1923 states that the manor house "may be in part Jacobean, and built possibly before 1644 by Sir Robert Belt, but was practically rebuilt in the 18th century, to which period the staircase and most of the internal panelling belong". As of 2020, the (now-dry) medieval moat with a brick bridge still remains, as does a 12-foot-high walled kitchen garden and another small garden. The manor is Grade II listed, and the earth-covered banks beside the moat are designated as a Scheduled Ancient Monument. The historic listing filed in January 1953 includes this summary of the building:Early C17 with mid C18 alterations. Brick in English bond, plain tile roof, brick stacks. Double pile plan beneath M-shaped roof with service wings to rear. 2 storeys and attic, 8 bays. 6-panel half-glazed door beneath divided overlight in fifth bay.

Church of St Botolph

The current church, dedicated to St Botolph, dates from around 1180, though as many as three earlier churches may have occupied the site. One of these is thought to have been built by the late Bishop Bosa. The transepts, nave and part of the tower are original, but the chancel was rebuilt in the 13th century and alterations were later made to the upper part of the tower. Monuments include a brass figure commemorating Robert Constable, a former chancellor of Dunelm, who died in the 1540s, and several memorials to members of the Belt family. The Borthwick Institute holds copies of the parish records which date to the early 17th century.

The Church of England records include this background information about the parish: A vicarage was ordained at Bossall in 1229. The rectory and advowson of the church initially descended with the manor of Bossall but by 1378 it had passed to the Nevill family. At some point between 1378 and 1386 it was alienated to Durham Priory by John Nevill for the maintenance of Durham College, Oxford. The advowson was fully appropriated to the college c.1404, and the college retained it until the Dissolution of the Monasteries when it was granted by the King to the Dean and Chapter of Durham.

A report published in 1839 states that the church was suffering from neglect at that time, although the interior walls had been recently cleaned. The vicarage, a white Elizabethan house built in 1838 and the home of Rev. Bolton Simpson at that time, was located nearby. By 2017, however, the church was described as "lovingly looked after".

References

External links

Villages in North Yorkshire